Gaius Julius Iullus may refer to:
Gaius Julius Iullus (consul 489 BC), the first ancient patrician to attain the consulship
Gaius Julius Iullus (decemvir), consul 482 BC, decemvir 451 BC
Gaius Julius Iullus (consul 447 BC), also consul 435 BC
Gaius Julius Iullus (censor),  consular tribune 408 and 405 BC, censor 393 BC